Pipaón is a village located in Alava in the Basque country, Spain, beneath Sierra de Cantabria. The total population is about 36 inhabitants. It has an ethnographic museum and dances that go back many years ago. It also has a cultural association called Usatxi in charge of cultural activities throughout the year. These include a living bethlehem made by the villagers and in some days the museum is made at the streets of the village. Here the townspeople perform daily activities of the people 100 years ago. The village has a small sport area where a football field and the bowling alley are included. In the main square of the village is located the only bar the village has.

History
According to some historians, is mentioned in the Fuero granted to the Puebla de Arganzón in 1191, Treviño in 1254 and subsequently to the jurisdiction of Peñacerrada in the 14th century. In 1975 he went to city hall Lagrán. After 425 years, its inhabitants bought their freedom, and 2 November 1802 received the title of town. For the record of this fact, in the entrance of the town a stick with a cross and a ring was put as a symbol of their freedom of lands of Count.

The "Usatxi" Cultural Association, having disappeared the ancient monolith, raised new one 27 September 1986 with a cut ash trunk that school children had planted near the cemetery in 1925. After 14 years fell due to inclement weather. On 16 November 2002, coinciding with the 200th anniversary of his liberty, the Juntas Generales of Álava put the current monolith stone with the cross, the ring and a commemorative plaque.

Throughout its history, the village has been traveled by Navarre and Castilian troops to go from Zaragoza to Bilbao. The villagers earned money grazing and sailing the coal which was transported through the port of Pipaon towards Herrera, to go to Laguardia and surrounding villages. Nowadays the old part of the village is decorated with emblazoned houses which doors are made by round arch of the 16th century, the ethnographic museum "Usatxi" and a Parish church, dedicated to the Feast of the Cross. The old school building, now, houses the cultural association "Usatxi". The villa has been expanded with new buildings

Populated places in Álava